Scott Billington (born October 27, 1951 in Melrose, Massachusetts) is an American record producer, songwriter, record company executive and blues musician.

Biography
Billington's career began in Boston in the early 1970s, when he managed the New England Music City record store and edited the music magazine Pop Top.  He was a member of the Boston Blues Society, which staged concerts by Son House, Mance Lipscomb, Johnny Shines and other first-generation bluesmen. In the mid 1970s he joined the staff of Rounder Records, where he first worked in the record label's sales, promotion and art departments.

In 1978, he and author Peter Guralnick edited live Boston Blues Society tapes to produce the Johnny Shines' album, Hey-Ba-Ba-Re Bop. He began producing for musicians in genres of music such as blues, Cajun, jazz and zydeco. His 1981 production of bluesman Clarence "Gatemouth" Brown won the first Grammy Award for Rounder Records. In the mid-1980s, he created the Modern New Orleans Masters Series for Rounder. Over the years, he has produced Charlie Rich, Solomon Burke, Johnny Adams, The Dirty Dozen Brass Band,  Soul Rebels Brass Band, Irma Thomas, James Booker, Tangle Eye, Girl Authority among other artists on Rounder and other labels. His records have won a total of 3 Grammy® Awards and 11 Grammy® nominations.

As a harmonica player, Billington has recorded with Irma Thomas, Boozoo Chavis, Sleepy LaBeef, Johnette Downing, Theryl deClouet and others. He has toured with Nathan Williams & the Zydeco Cha Chas, a Louisiana-based zydeco band, appearing at the New Orleans Jazz and Heritage Festival, the Efes Pilsen Blues Festival (Istanbul) and the Montreal Jazz Festival. He played harmonica on the soundtrack to the Henry Fonda/Myrna Loy ABC-TV film, Summer Solstice, and on the PBS-TV series Zoom and Nova.

Billington's writing has appeared in Yankee, the Oxford American, Gambit and The Boston Globe. He has also written liner notes for many of his recordings. He has lectured at Harvard University, the New England Conservatory of Music, and Loyola University, as well as at several Grammy in the Schools events. As a graphic designer and art director, Billington created hundreds of album covers for Rounder and other labels.

Billington is employed as vice president of A&R for Rounder/Concord Records. He lives in New Orleans with his wife, the children's musician and author Johnette Downing, with whom he performs as the duo Johnette and Scott.

Awards

2017

Grammy Award (Producer of Bobby Rush's Porcupine Meat)

2011

Offbeat (New Orleans) Lifetime Achievement Award

2010

Grammy nomination (co-producer of Woody Guthrie's My Dusty Road collection)

2007

Sweet Soul Music Award, awarded by the Porretta Soul Festival, Porretta Terme, Italy

Grammy Award (producer of Irma Thomas's After the Rain)

2002

Keeping the Blues Alive Award for Producer, awarded by The Blues Foundation

1996

Offbeat Magazine (New Orleans) Best Producer Award (shared with Allen Toussaint)

1990

Nominated as Producer of the Year, Boston Music Awards

1989

Nominated as Producer of the Year, Boston Music Awards

1987

Communication Arts Magazine Award of Excellence

1985

Appointment as Colonel on the staff of Louisiana Governor Edwin W. Edwards

1984

Communication Arts Magazine Award of Excellence

1982

Grammy Award (co-producer of Clarence "Gatemouth" Brown's Alright Again!)

Partial credits

For complete credits please see 

2020

Waves, Burke Ingraffia (Producer, Harmonica)

2013	

Skydog: The Duane Allman Retrospective, Duane Allman (Art Direction, Design, Executive Producer)

Swamp People (Compilation Producer, Harmonica, Producer)

American Radical Patriot, Woody Guthrie (Art Direction)

2012

Meet Me at Mardi Gras (Compilation Producer, Liner Notes)

St. Peter & 57th St., Preservation Hall Jazz Band  (Mixing)

Twenty Dozen, The Dirty Dozen Brass Band (Producer)

Unlock Your Mind, The Soul Rebels (Producer)

2010	

Live in Boston, 1982, George Thorogood & the Destroyers (Producer)

2009	

My Dusty Road, Woody Guthrie (Art Direction, Reissue Producer) GRAMMY® NOMINEE

The Soul Queen of New Orleans: 50th Anniversary, Irma Thomas (Compilation Producer, Composer, Harmonica, Producer, Remixing, Tambourine)

2008

Pretty Runs Out, Amanda Shaw (Composer, Producer)

Simply Grand, Irma Thomas (Liner Notes, Photography, Producer) GRAMMY® NOMINEE

2007	

City of Dreams: A Collection of New Orleans Music (Annotation, Editing, Liner Notes, Mixing, Producer)

Road Trip, Girl Authority (Composer, Harmonica, Mini Moog, Producer)

2006	

After the Rain, Irma Thomas (Composer, Producer, Tambourine) GRAMMY® WINNER

Girl Authority, Girl Authority (Harmonica, Producer)

Hang It High, Hang It Low, Nathan Williams & the Zydeco Cha Chas (Composer, Liner Notes, Producer)

The Great Johnny Adams R&B Album, Johnny Adams (Compilation Producer, Mixing, Producer)

2005	

A Celebration of New Orleans Music to Benefit the Musicares Hurricane Relief (Photography, Producer)

Daily Bread, Corey Harris (Composer, Mixing, Producer)

The Complete Library of Congress Recordings, Jelly Roll Morton (Project Coordinator)

The Great Johnny Adams Blues Album, Johnny Adams (Producer)

2004	

Alan Lomax's Southern Journey Remixed, Tangle Eye (Arranger, Beats, Composer, Cover Photo, Harmonica, Sounds, Wurlitzer)

Sense of Light, Clarence Bucaro (Producer)

Soul of the Night (Compilation Producer, Producer)

The Essential Collection, Bill Morrissey (Art Direction, Compilation Producer, Producer)

2003	

Box of the Blues (Art Direction, Liner Notes, Producer)

2002
	
Cajun Music: The Essential Collection (Art Direction, Compilation Producer, Design, Liner Notes, Mixing, Producer)

Live! The Loom's Desire, Laura Nyro (Editing, Mixing, Producer)

Righteous! The Essential Collection, The Holmes Brothers (Compilation Producer, Percussion, Producer)

Zydeco: The Essential Collection (Art Direction, Compilation Producer, Harmonica, Liner Notes, Producer, Vocals, Background Vocals)

2001	

Any Woman's Blues (Art Direction, Compilation Producer, Liner Notes, Producer)

Down Home on Dog Hill, Boozoo Chavis (Harmonica, Producer)

If You Want It, Come and Get It, Irma Thomas (Art Direction, Compilation Producer, Design, Harmonica, Liner Notes, Mixing, Producer)

Keep It Rollin': The Blues Piano Collection (Art Direction, Compilation Producer, Design, Mixing)

Mardi Gras in New Orleans (Art Direction, Compilation Producer, Design, Mixing, Producer)

Rockabilly Blues, Sleepy LaBeef (Compilation Producer, Harmonica, Liner Notes, Mixing, Producer)

Roots Music: An American Journey (Art Direction, Essay, Liner Notes, Mixing, Producer, Song Notes)

The Best of Beau Jocque & The Zydeco Hi-Rollers, Beau Jocque & The Zydeco Hi-Rollers (Annotation, Art Direction, Compilation Producer, Design, Producer)

The Best of the Crawfish Years, 1985–1991, BeauSoleil (Compilation Producer, Mixing)

The Houseman Cometh!, Theryl DeClouet (Harmonica, Producer, Background Vocals)

Wake up Call, Michelle Willson (Producer, Background Vocals)

2000	

Best Kept Secret, Chris Ardoin & Double Clutchin' (Producer)

Give Him Cornbread, Live!, Beau Jocque & The Zydeco Hi-Rollers (Liner Notes, Producer)

Johnnie Billy Goat, Boozoo Chavis (Art Direction, Compilation Producer, Design, Engineer, Liner Notes)

Let's Go, Nathan & the Zydeco Cha Chas (Composer, Harmonica, Producer)

My Heart's in Memphis: The Songs of Dan Penn, Irma Thomas (Percussion, Producer)

On the Prowl, Walter "Wolfman" Washington (Producer)

Swingin' the Blues, Claude "Fiddler" Williams (Producer)

The Toughest Girl Alive, Candye Kane (Percussion, Producer)

The Ultimate Collection, Buckwheat Zydeco (Producer)

There Is Always One More Time, Johnny Adams (Art Direction, Design, Liner Notes, Producer)

1999	

Allons en Louisiane: The Rounder Records Guide to Cajun Music, Zydeco & South Louisiana (Compilation Producer, Producer)

Good Day for the Blues, Ruth Brown (Liner Notes, Producer) GRAMMY® NOMINEE

Love Like Yours & Mine, Davell Crawford (Producer)

The Whop Boom Bam, All That (Producer, Background Vocals)

Tryin' to Make a Little Love, Michelle Willson (Art Direction, Design, Harmonica, Producer)

Who Stole My Monkey?, Boozoo Chavis (Producer)

1998	

Ain't No Funk Like N.O. Funk (Compilation Producer, Producer)

B-3 and Me, Davell Crawford (Producer)

Check It Out, Lock It In, Crank It Up, Beau Jocque & The Zydeco Hi-Rollers (Composer, Producer)

Funk Is in the House, Walter "Wolfman" Washington (Producer)

La Chanson Perdue, Geno Delafose (Liner Notes, Producer, Background Vocals)

Man of My Word, Johnny Adams (Design, Producer)

Modern New Orleans Masters (Design, Harmonica, Liner Notes, Mixing, Producer, Production Coordination)

Sing It!, Marcia Ball, Irma Thomas, Tracy Nelson (Producer, Tambourine) GRAMMY® NOMINEE

To the Country, Bluerunners (Producer)

Turn the Page, Chris Ardoin (Producer)

1997	

Funknicity, New Orleans Nightcrawlers (Producer)

Gon' Be Jus' Fine, Chris Ardoin & Double Clutchin' (Design, Producer)

I'm a Zydeco Hog: Live at the Rock 'N' Bowl, New Orleans, Nathan Williams & the Zydeco Cha Chas (Composer, Liner Notes, Producer)

Promised Land, The Holmes Brothers (Harmonica, Producer)

R+B = Ruth Brown, Ruth Brown (Design, Producer) GRAMMY® NOMINEE

Z-Funk, Li'l Brian & The Zydeco Travelers (Design, Harmonica, Producer, Background Vocals)

1996	

Africa Worldwide: 35th Anniversary Album, Tabu Ley Rochereau (Design, Producer)

Gonna Take You Downtown, Beau Jocque & The Zydeco Hi-Rollers (Design, Mixing, Photography, Producer)

Mood Indigo, New Orleans C.A.C. Jazz Orchestra (Mixing, Producer)

One Foot in the Blues, Johnny Adams (Design, Horn Arrangements, Liner Notes, Producer)

That's What I'm Talkin' About!, Geno Delafose (Composer, Design, Producer)

The Barber's Blues, Chuck Carbo (Design, Producer)

You'll Never Get to Heaven, Bill Morrissey (Producer)

1995	

Creole Crossroads, Nathan Williams & the Zydeco Cha Chas (Producer, Background Vocals)

Fresh, Li'l Brian & The Zydeco Travelers (Design, Liner Notes, Percussion, Producer, Background Vocals)

Git It, Beau Jocque!, Beau Jocque & The Zydeco Hi-Rollers (Design, Producer)

La Toussaint, Steve Riley & the Mamou Playboys (Producer)

Let Them Talk, Davell Crawford (Design, Producer)

Right on Time, Little Buster and the Soul Brothers (Design, Producer)

The Royal Family of Zydeco (Composer, Producer)

The Verdict, Johnny Adams (Harmonica, Producer)

Till the Night is Gone: A Tribute to Doc Pomus (Producer)

1994	

French Rockin' Boogie, Geno Delafose (Design, Liner Notes, Percussion, Producer)

Live! At the Habibi Temple, Boozoo Chavis (Design, Producer)

Muzina, Tabu Ley Rochereau (Design, Producer)

Pick Up on This!, Beau Jocque & The Zydeco Hi-Rollers (Composer, Design, Liner Notes, Percussion, Producer)

Strange Things Happening, Sleepy LaBeef (Design, Harmonica)

Willing & Able, Dalton Reed (Design, Harmonica, Liner Notes, Producer)

1993	

Beau Jocque Boogie, Beau Jocque & The Zydeco Hi-Rollers  (Design, Producer)

Blues Stay Away from Me, John Delafose & the Eunice Playboys (Design, Piano, Producer)

Follow Me Chicken, Nathan Williams & the Zydeco Cha Chas  (Composer, Harmonica, Liner Notes, Producer, Background Vocals)

Good Morning Heartache, Johnny Adams  (Design, Liner Notes, Producer)

Jelly, The Dirty Dozen Brass Band  (Producer)

Resurrection of the Bayou Maharajah: Live at the Maple Leaf Bar, James Booker (Design, Imaging, Photo Imaging, Producer)

Soul Street, The Holmes Brothers  (Percussion, Producer)

Spiders on the Keys: Live at the Maple Leaf Bar, James Booker  (Design, Imaging, Liner Notes, Producer)

Walk Around Heaven: New Orleans Gospel Soul, Irma Thomas  (Design, Producer)

1992
	
Gonna Stick and Stay, Paul Kelly (Design, Liner Notes, Percussion, Producer)

Jubilation, The Holmes Brothers (Producer, Background Vocals)

Old World Beat, Klezmer Conservatory Band (Producer)

Open Up: Whatcha Gonna Do for the Rest of Your Life?, The Dirty Dozen Brass Band (Producer)

Pere Et Garcon Zydeco, John Delafose (Design, Producer)

Pictures And Paintings, Charlie Rich (Producer)

True Believer, Irma Thomas  (Design, Producer)

1991	

Johnny Adams Sings Doc Pomus: The Real Me, Johnny Adams (Design, Producer)

Live! Simply the Best, Irma Thomas (Liner Notes, Producer) GRAMMY® NOMINEE

Louisiana Soul Man, Dalton Reed (Composer, Harmonica, Percussion, Producer, Background Vocals)

Mardi Gras Party  (Art Direction, Compilation Producer, Editing, Engineer, Mastering, Mixing, Percussion, Producer)

Where It's At, The Holmes Brothers (Design, Hand Coloring, Producer)

Wolf at the Door, Walter "Wolfman" Washington  (Design, Liner Notes, Producer, Background Vocals)

Your Mama Don't Know, Nathan Williams & the Zydeco Cha Chas  (Composer, Design, Harmonica, Producer)

1990	

In the Spirit, The Holmes Brothers  (Design, Producer)

Spanic Boys, Spanic Boys  (Art Direction, Design, Producer)

The New Orleans Album, The Dirty Dozen Brass Band (Producer)

Zydeco Shootout at El Sid O's  (Design, Producer)

1989	

Steady Rock, Nathan Williams & the Zydeco Cha Chas  (Art Direction, Composer, Design, Producer, Background Vocals)

Voodoo, The Dirty Dozen Brass Band  (Producer)

Walking on a Tightrope: The Songs of Percy Mayfield, Johnny Adams  (Art Direction, Design, Producer)

Zydeco Live!, Vol. 1 (Design, Liner Notes, Producer)

Zydeco Live!, Vol. 2 (Design, Liner Notes, Producer)

1988	

Dreams of Love, Tony Dagradi  (Design, Producer)

Jumpin' Night in the Garden of Eden, Klezmer Conservatory Band  (Producer)

Out of the Dark, Walter "Wolfman" Washington (Design, Producer)

Room with a View of the Blues, Johnny Adams (Design, Producer)

Steppin' Out, David Torkanowsky  (Art Direction, Design, Producer)

Swing, Duke Robillard (Design, Producer)

The Way I Feel, Irma Thomas (Design, Harmonica, Producer)

You Got Me, Duke Robillard (Design, Producer, Vocal Harmony)

1987	

A Few Old Memories, Hazel Dickens (Harmonica)

Buckwheat's Zydeco Party, Buckwheat Zydeco (Art Direction, Compilation Producer, Design, Liner Notes, Producer)

Graciously, Alvin "Red" Tyler (Design, Producer)

1986	

A Change Is Gonna Come, Solomon Burke (Design, Producer)

Heritage, Alvin "Red" Tyler (Design, Producer)

The New Rules, Irma Thomas (Design, Producer)

Wolf Tracks, Walter "Wolfman" Washington (Design, Producer)

After Dark, Johnny Adams (Design, Producer)

Hot Tamale Baby, Marcia Ball (Design, Producer)

Live: Mardi Gras in Montreux, The Dirty Dozen Brass Band (Editing, Mixing)

Nothin' But the Truth, Sleepy LaBeef (Design, Harmonica, Producer, Background Vocals)

1985	

Too Hot to Handle, Duke Robillard (Percussion, Piano, Producer)

Waitin' for My Ya Ya, Buckwheat Zydeco Ils Sont Partis Band (Design, Producer) GRAMMY® NOMINEE

From the Heart, Johnny Adams (Producer)

New Orleans Piano Professor, Tuts Washington (Design, Photography, Producer)

1983	

By the Sweat of My Brow, Hazel Dickens (Harmonica)

Soul Alive!, Solomon Burke (Editing, Mixing)

Turning Point, Buckwheat Zydeco (Design, Producer) GRAMMY® NOMINEE

Classified, James Booker (Design, Editing, Liner Notes, Mixing, Producer)

1982	

Electricity, Sleepy LaBeef (Harmonica, Producer)
One More Mile, Clarence "Gatemouth" Brown (Design, Producer) GRAMMY® NOMINEE

1981	
Alright Again!, Clarence "Gatemouth" Brown (Producer) GRAMMY® WINNER

1980	
Hard Hitting Songs for Hard Hit People, Hazel Dickens (Harmonica)
Mr. Blues is Back to Stay, Robert Jr. Lockwood and Johnny Shines (Design, Producer)

1979
Hangin' On, Robert Jr. Lockwood and Johnny Shines (Design, Production Assistance)

1978	
Hey Ba-Ba-Re-Bop, Johnny Shines (Producer)

Living on the Hallelujah Side, Joseph Spence (Engineer, Liner Notes)

References

External links
ScottBillington.com 
 
Scott Billington at Answers.com

1951 births
Living people
American blues harmonica players
Record producers from Massachusetts
Songwriters from Massachusetts
Grammy Award winners
Zydeco musicians
People from Melrose, Massachusetts
Songwriters from Louisiana